"The Candy Man" (or alternatively, "The Candy Man Can") is a song that originally appeared in the 1971 film Willy Wonka & the Chocolate Factory. It was written by Leslie Bricusse and Anthony Newley specifically for the film. Although the original 1964 book by Roald Dahl (Charlie and the Chocolate Factory) contains lyrics adapted for other songs in the film, the lyrics to "The Candy Man" do not appear in the book. The soundtrack version of the song was sung by Aubrey Woods, who played Bill the candy store owner in the film.

Attempt at replacing the Woods vocal
Lyricist Anthony Newley has said in interviews that upon hearing Woods' rendition for the first time, he was appalled at the lack of commerciality in the performance – worrying that it would possibly be depriving the duo of not only a hit record, but an Oscar nomination as well.

Newley's distaste for the performance became so intense that he was willing to forego his own performance fee if he were to be allowed to re-arrange and re-record the song himself as well as pay for the session. When denied by producer David Wolper due to contractual stipulations by film composer Walter Scharf, Newley tried another tactic: lobbying to be allowed to at least re-dub his own vocal, possibly becoming the ghost voice for Woods; however, Woods's contract forbade that as well. Anthony Newley recorded his own version for MGM Records in 1971 before Sammy Davis Jr.'s hit.

Sammy Davis Jr. version 

Sammy Davis Jr.'s version appears on the Sammy Davis Jr. Now album. Although Davis admitted to disliking the song, finding it too saccharine, it became his only number-one hit, spending three weeks at the top of the Billboard Hot 100 chart starting 10 June 1972, and two weeks at the top of the easy-listening chart. Billboard ranked it as the No. 5 song for 1972. The track featured backing vocals by the Mike Curb Congregation, who earlier released an unsuccessful version of the song. It is recognized as one of Davis's signature songs, and "The Candy Man" came to be his moniker later in his career. The song was nominated for a Grammy Award for Best Pop Vocal Performance, Male at the 15th Annual Grammy Awards.

In 2014, Sammy Davis Jr.'s lead vocals from the original 1972 recording were sampled to create a "virtual duet" with singer Barry Manilow, which appeared on Manilow's album My Dream Duets.

Chart history

Weekly charts

Year-end charts

Certifications

Zedd version

"Candyman" was covered by German-Russian producer Zedd featuring American singer Aloe Blacc and released as a single on February 26, 2016, to celebrate the 75th anniversary of M&M's.

Production
The song was recorded by Zedd with help from Grey and Joseph Trapanese.

Critical reception
The track received generally positive reviews. Hugh McIntyre wrote that the song is catchy and fun. Aloe Blacc's vocals were praised by Ryan Middleton, who thought that they fit well with Zedd's music. The song was criticized by Diplo, saying that the song was a "rip-off" of Flume.

Charts

Year-end charts

Certifications

Other uses
"The Candy Man" has been featured in a number of radio, films and TV shows after its introduction in Willy Wonka & the Chocolate Factory. 
 In the 1980s, the tune was adapted as a commercial jingle ("The Sunshine Baker Man", sung by Davis) for Sunshine Biscuits.
 Sloppy Seconds recorded a cover of the song for their 1989 LP Destroyed.
 In the animated television series The Simpsons episode "Trash of the Titans", Homer sings "The Garbage Man", a parody. As the Springfield Sanitation Commissioner, Homer sings about all the things the garbage men will do (take the trash out, "stomp it down for you", "shake the plastic bag and do the twisty thingy, too", etc.), assisted by a montage, guest starring U2.
 In the animated television series Ren and Stimpy episode "Sammy and Me", Sammy Mantis sings "The Mantid Man", a parody about things mantises do ("say his prayers when he's eating lunch", "eat his siblings" etc.). 
 Jennifer Tilly's character, Monica Moran, sings the song in an audition to be a lounge singer in the film The Fabulous Baker Boys.
 Chris Evans originally played the song on his popular drive time BBC Radio 2 show every Friday afternoon. When he replaced Terry Wogan on the breakfast show in January 2010, he continued to play the tune every Friday morning, immediately following the 8:00 am news until around 2014. The song was also used on a TV trailer, promoting his breakfast show. 
 Danny Baker used the song extensively as a theme during his breakfast show for BBC London 94.9. He would reward listeners who phoned into the show and greeted him as Candy Man. During his time on the show, he amassed a large number of existing versions of the song and commissioned guests such as Ray Gelato to produce new versions. He continued to use the song as a theme tune for his afternoon show on BBC London 94.9 until its cancellation.
 Elaut used this song as the attract mode for its Candyman claw machines.
 In an episode of the American TV series My Name Is Earl (season 1, episode 24), Randy Hickey finds a coin in a drain, which is accompanied by an instrumental rendition of "The Candy Man".
 In Season 2, Episode 13 of the American TV series Malcolm in the Middle ("New Neighbours"), Commandant Spangler (Daniel von Bargen) makes Francis Wilkerson and the other cadets sing the song to impress his hero, Oliver North. It was featured again in Season 3, Episode 19 ("Clip Show").
 On Krayzie Bone's 1999 album Thug Mentality 1999, he uses the melody and meter of "Candy Man" for the intro to the song "Dummy Man".
 Comedian Tim Hawkins released a parody of the song, "The Government Can", in 2009. The video for the song went viral and has garnered over 7.6 million hits on YouTube.
 M&M Mars used the song from time to time as a jingle for "The M&M's Man". EDM artist Zedd later released his single "Candyman", which samples the original song, to commemorate the 75th anniversary of M&M's candy. An M&M's ad featuring the song shows Red and Yellow trying to remix the "M&M's Man" jingle with help from Zedd and Aloe Blacc.
 The Kidsongs singers include this song in their 1986 video "What I Want to Be".
 Rockapella sang their own version of the song on February 9, 2016, in honor of Valentine's Day.
 In the DreamWorks Animation movie Madagascar, the song was used twice – the first was in normal speed when Alex the lion is tranquilized at Grand Central Station, then again at a faster speed when he is tranquilized again before being placed in a box.
 In the Blue Sky Studios film Ice Age: Continental Drift, Manny sings this song when he realizes his crew are about to be attacked by Sirens.
 Launa Windows, a company based in Devon, England, used the song's melody to advertise their company on UK television in the early 2000s. Its lyrics include, "Who can fix your windows, make your home secure? The Launa Man can."
 The Broadway production of Charlie and the Chocolate Factory features Willy Wonka singing this song at the top of the show, just as he disguises himself as a candy store owner.
 In 2014, the funk metal band Primus covered "The Candy Man" for their album Primus & the Chocolate Factory with the Fungi Ensemble. The album is a psychedelic re-imagining of the soundtrack for the 1971 film Willy Wonka & the Chocolate Factory.
 Apple Inc. chose Aubrey Woods' recording of the song as the background music for its 2021 iPhone 12 "Mmmmm, purple" television commercial.
 Sammy Davis Jr's recording is heard in the intro for the 2021 film, Candyman.

References

Songs about occupations
1971 songs
1972 singles
Aloe Blacc songs
Sammy Davis Jr. songs
Billboard Hot 100 number-one singles
Cashbox number-one singles
Songs written by Anthony Newley
Songs written by Leslie Bricusse
Song recordings produced by Mike Curb
Willy Wonka
Songs written for films
2016 singles
Interscope Records singles
Zedd songs
MGM Records singles
Vocal jazz songs